Football is the most popular sport, both in terms of participants and spectators, in Rio de Janeiro. Rio de Janeiro has several of Brazil's significant football clubs, and the city is home to many football clubs.

History 
Rio de Janeiro has a long football history

Maracanã Stadium, It was the main home venue of the Brazil national football team.

Clubs 
There are many successful football clubs in Rio de Janeiro

There are also other clubs in Rio de Janeiro state

Americano
Angra dos Reis
Boavista
Cabofriense
Campo Grande
Casimiro de Abreu
Duque de Caxias
Estácio de Sá
Friburguense
Goytacaz
Nova Iguaçu
Olaria
Serrano
São Cristóvão
Volta Redonda

There were some other club, which are now extinct, in Rio de Janeiro:

Football and Athletic
Haddock Lobo
Mangueira
Paissandu
Riachuelo
Rio Cricket
Syrio e Libanez
Villa Isabel

Honours 
 Brazil football champion (16)
 Flamengo:  (7)
 CR Vasco da Gama: (4)
 Fluminense: (4)
 Botafogo: (1)

Rio de Janeiro derby 
Flamengo (Rio de Janeiro) vs. Fluminense (Rio de Janeiro) The Fla-Flu("Fla-Flu")
Flamengo (Rio de Janeiro) vs. Vasco (Rio de Janeiro) The Classic of Millions("O Clássico dos Milhões")
Botafogo (Rio de Janeiro) vs. Flamengo (Rio de Janeiro) The Rivalry Derby("Clássico da Rivalidade")
Botafogo (Rio de Janeiro) vs. Fluminense (Rio de Janeiro) The Grandpa Derby("Clássico Vovô")(so-called because it is the oldest derby played in Brazil)
Vasco (Rio de Janeiro) vs. Botafogo (Rio de Janeiro) The Black-and-white Derby("Clássico Alvinegro")
Vasco (Rio de Janeiro) vs. Fluminense (Rio de Janeiro) The Giants Derby("Clássico dos Gigantes") 
América (Rio de Janeiro) vs. Vasco (Rio de Janeiro) The Peace Derby("Clássico da Paz")
Americano (Campos dos Goytacazes) vs. Goytacaz (Campos dos Goytacazes) Goyta-Cano("Clássico Goyta-Cano"), Campos Bay Classic''("Clássico da Baía de Campos")

Stadia 
 Maracanã Stadium: Hosted the 1950 FIFA World Cup Final and 2014 FIFA World Cup Final

See also
Football in Brazil
Football in São Paulo

References